Islands is the seventh studio album by the Canadian-American rock group the Band. Released in 1977 to mixed reviews, it is the final studio album from the group's original lineup.

Primarily composed of previously unreleased songs from the Band's career (including their 1976 cover of "Georgia on My Mind", which was recorded to aid Jimmy Carter in his presidential bid), Islands was released to fulfill the group's contract with Capitol Records, so that the soundtrack to their film The Last Waltz could be released on Warner Bros. Records. In the CD liner notes, Robbie Robertson compares the album to the Who's Odds & Sods.

John Bauldie in Q magazine called the album "a ragbag of old outtakes and otherwise unplaceable new numbers".

Track listing

Side one

Side two

 Sides one and two were combined as tracks 1–10 on CD reissues.

Bonus tracks from 2001 CD re-release

Personnel
The Band
Rick Danko – bass guitar, vocals
Levon Helm – drums, vocals
Garth Hudson – organ, synthesizers, saxophones, accordion, piccolo on "Islands"
Richard Manuel – piano, electric piano, vocals
Robbie Robertson – guitars, lead vocal on "Knockin' Lost John"

Additional musicians
Jim Gordon – flute on "Islands"
Tom Malone – trombone on "Islands"
John Simon – alto saxophone on "Islands"
Larry Packer – violin on "Islands"

Production
Ed Anderson – engineering
Neil Brody – engineering
Rob Fraboni – engineering
Nat Jeffrey – engineering

References

1977 albums
The Band albums
Capitol Records albums
Albums produced by Garth Hudson
Albums produced by Levon Helm
Albums produced by Richard Manuel
Albums produced by Rick Danko
Albums produced by Robbie Robertson
Albums recorded at Shangri-La (recording studio)